Serge Pacôme Djiéhoua (born September 25, 1983, in Abidjan) is an Ivorian footballer who plays as a forward for Sarayköy Spor.

Career
On 24 August 2008, he made his debut for Antalyaspor against Beşiktaş JK in the Süper Lig, scoring his team's second goal in a losing effort.
On 23 December, Gabala revealed that Djiéhoua's contract with the club was terminated.

Djiéhoua was sent off seven seconds after coming on in his debut for Glyfada against Olympiacos Volou.

In September 2014, Djiéhoua signed for Cizrespor. He signed for the fourth tier club, because he thought it was the Süper Lig team, Çaykur Rizespor. When he arrived at the airport, he was surprised to be greeted by Cizrespor fans instead of Rizespor fans. It was the moment he realized he signed for the wrong team. He left the club after the 2014 Kobanî protests.

Career statistics

References

External links
 TFF Profile
 

1983 births
Living people
Ivorian footballers
Ivorian expatriate footballers
Footballers from Abidjan
Kaizer Chiefs F.C. players
Antalyaspor footballers
Association football forwards
Stella Club d'Adjamé players
Süper Lig players
Expatriate soccer players in South Africa
Expatriate footballers in Turkey
Gabala FC players
Expatriate footballers in Azerbaijan